Taikapeili was a Finnish pop music duo consisting of Hanna-Riikka Siitonen and Nina Tapio. They gained success in Finland in the mid-1990s with their debut album Suuri salaisuus (1994), earning them double platinum after selling 95 715 copies. Taikapeili went on to release two more albums before eventually breaking up. Their first hit, "Jos sulla on toinen", was also their biggest one. It was sampled by rapper Cheek in his 2013 song "Jossu".

Selected discography

Studio albums

Compilation albums

References

Finnish pop music groups
Finnish musical duos
Female musical duos